Neil Graham Moss (born 10 May 1975 in New Milton, Hampshire) is a retired footballer who last played as a goalkeeper for AFC Bournemouth.

Playing career
Moss started his career at AFC Bournemouth as a trainee in May 1992 and signed his first professional contract with the club in January 1993. He moved to Southampton in December 1995 for a fee of £250,000, where he proved to be a reliable, steady goalkeeper but was unable to  displace Paul Jones or Antti Niemi as first choice goalkeeper. After only making 22 starts in eight years, he returned to Bournemouth in February 2003.

Moss is well known as a lifelong Bournemouth supporter – he used to watch the team play from the terraces before signing for the club.

During Bournemouth's 1–0 home victory against Millwall on 17 March 2007, Moss was in the net in the South Stand, where the Millwall fans were, and he had over 30 coins (totalling around £5) thrown at him. In an interview with BBC Radio 5 Live two days later, he revealed that he had escaped from the incident unhurt.

Due to a long-standing wrist injury which failed to heal sufficiently, Moss announced his immediate retirement on 14 July 2008.

Coaching career
Moss currently runs a goalkeeping coaching company, which he set up in 2007.

Moss is now goalkeeping coach for Bournemouth, having signed for the 2009–10 season.

Career statistics

Club

References

External links

1975 births
Living people
English footballers
Association football goalkeepers
AFC Bournemouth players
Gillingham F.C. players
Southampton F.C. players
Premier League players
People from New Milton
AFC Bournemouth non-playing staff